PS Sudan is a passenger-carrying side-wheel paddle steamer on the River Nile in Egypt. Along with PS Arabia, she was one of the largest river steamers in Thomas Cook's Nile fleet. Some scenes of the ITV television film of Agatha Christie's Death on the Nile were filmed aboard Sudan. 

The steamer spent the latter years of the 20th century laid up and in deteriorating condition but new French owners bought her in 2000 and returned her to service in 2001.

In 2004, she was again used for an adaptation of Death on the Nile.

See also 
 Sofitel Winter Palace Hotel

References

External links
Steam Ship Sudan Egypte official website

Ships built on the River Clyde
Paddle steamers
1921 ships
Nile
Ships of Egypt
Steamships of Egypt